Westview is a census-designated place (CDP) in Miami-Dade County, Florida, United States. The population was 9,923 at the 2020 census.

Geography
It is bordered to the north and northwest by Opa-locka, to the northeast by North Miami, to the southeast by Pinewood, to the south by West Little River, and to the west by Hialeah.

Demographics

2020 census

Note: the US Census treats Hispanic/Latino as an ethnic category. This table excludes Latinos from the racial categories and assigns them to a separate category. Hispanics/Latinos can be of any race.

2000 Census
At the 2000 census there were 9,692 people, 2,914 households, and 2,235 families living in the CDP. The racial makeup of the CDP was 17.01% White (3.9% were Non-Hispanic White,) 75.63% African American, 0.43% Native American, 0.41% Asian, 0.13% Pacific Islander, 3.01% from other races, and 3.36% from two or more races. Hispanic or Latino of any race were 19.76%.

Of the 2,914 households 37.6% had children under the age of 18 living with them, 37.1% were married couples living together, 31.4% had a female householder with no husband present, and 23.3% were non-families. 19.0% of households were one person and 7.7% were one person aged 65 or older.  The average household size was 3.32 and the average family size was 3.74.

The age distribution was 31.2% under the age of 18, 11.1% from 18 to 24, 25.6% from 25 to 44, 22.6% from 45 to 64, and 9.5% 65 or older.  The median age was 31 years. For every 100 females, there were 88.2 males.  For every 100 females age 18 and over, there were 81.4 males.

The median household income was $28,943 and the median family income  was $31,289. Males had a median income of $23,052 versus $22,933 for females. The per capita income for the CDP was $11,887.  About 23.2% of families and 26.0% of the population were below the poverty line, including 32.4% of those under age 18 and 24.9% of those age 65 or over.

As of 2000, speakers of English as a first language accounted for 68.37% of residents, while Spanish made up 20.61%, French Creole was at 10.16%, and French was the mother tongue of 0.84% of the population.

References

Census-designated places in Miami-Dade County, Florida
Census-designated places in Florida